Robert F. Rock was appointed as interim chief of the Los Angeles Police Department from January 16, 1978, to March 28, 1978, between the administrations of Edward M. Davis and Daryl F. Gates

References

Chiefs of the Los Angeles Police Department
Year of birth missing (living people)
Living people